William G. Selman (born c. 1939) is a retired head coach of men's college, university and professional ice hockey teams.

Career
Bill Selman was a three year letterman for the North Dakota Fighting Sioux, winning a national title with the team in his senior season. After two seasons as an assistant in Grand Forks Selman became the third consecutive assistant coach to be promoted to head coach of the Sioux in 1966. Selman led North Dakota to two conference tournament titles in each of his first two seasons, finishing as runners up in 1968. After only two years Selman left his alma mater to take over at Minnesota–Duluth. Two seasons later Selman once again changed universities, this time leading the new Division I program at Saint Louis.

The Billikens would only remain in the upper echelon for nine years but Selman stayed with the team for the entire time being a driving force behind the formation of the CCHA, capturing three conference titles, three conference tournament championships and coaching three future NHL players (Mike Krushelnyski, Mario Faubert and Lindsay Middlebrook). Once Saint Louis ended their program Selman moved on to be the head coach of the IHL's Dayton Gems for the 1979–80 season. After a year off Selman was back in the college ranks, this time with the Lake Superior State Lakers. He coached Team USA at the 1982 World Ice Hockey Championships but finished with a disastrous  0-6-1 record that saw the US relegated out of the top bracket. Selman would only coach Lake Superior State for 20 games the following season before retiring from coaching and taking a job with Anheuser-Busch in the sports marketing department.

In his career Selman was named as coach of the year for both the WCHA (1967) and CCHA (1977) while also receiving the 2014 President's Choice Award from the St. Louis Sports Hall of Fame and the 2016 Hobey Baker Legends of College Hockey Award.

Head coaching record

College

† Selman resigned in December 1982

References

External links
 

Living people
Year of birth missing (living people)
Canadian ice hockey coaches
Minnesota Duluth Bulldogs men's ice hockey coaches
North Dakota Fighting Hawks men's ice hockey players
North Dakota Fighting Hawks men's ice hockey coaches
Saint Louis Billikens men's ice hockey coaches
Lake Superior State Lakers men's ice hockey coaches
Ice hockey people from Ontario
Sportspeople from Fort Frances
Ice hockey in Dayton, Ohio
Canadian ice hockey defencemen
NCAA men's ice hockey national champions